Schiffermuelleria grandis is a species of moth belonging to the family Oecophoridae.

It is native to Central and Western Europe.

References

Oecophoridae
Moths described in 1842